This is the list of programs that are being broadcast by WAPA-TV television network in Puerto Rico. WAPA-TV for years has shown boxing, BSN basketball, telenovelas, movies, comedies, sitcoms (both American and domestic), baseball, NFL football, both World Wrestling Entertainment (WWE) and Puerto Rican World Wrestling Council (WWC) professional wrestling and human interest shows. Current day programming originating from the major American English broadcast networks is replaced with alternate programming on the national WAPA America feed.

Former Programming 
Despierta Puerto Rico
Hoy
Ahí Viene Iris Chacón
El Condominio
Club Sunshine
El Show de Raymond (1998-2005)
SuperXclusivo (2000-2013)
Entre Nosotras (2007-2016)
El Tiempo es oro con Mr. Cash
Sunshine Remix
Risas en Combo
Juntos en la Mañana (2016-2017)
Mete Mano
Sunshine's Cafe
Entrando por la Cocina
El Show del Mediodia
Mediodia Puerto Rico
Sacando Chispa
Gana con Ganas
Hello WAPA
Todo Va
A Millon
Aplausos
Solteros Siempre
Cine Recreo con Pacheco
La Hora de la Aventura/Aventuras Por El 4
Sube, Nene, Sube
El Kiosko Budweiser
Family K (children)
Pica-Pica (children)

Current programming

Weekday
 NotiCentro Al Amanecer
 La Reina del Flow
 Pégate al Mediodía
 ¡Viva la Tarde!
 Lazos de Sangre
 Lo Se Todo
 Los Datos son los Datos con Jay Fonseca
 NotiCentro Edición Estelar
 Guerreros
 Función Estelar
 Burbu Nite
 Cuarto Poder
 Fugitiva
 NCIS: Los Angeles (series)
 NCIS (series)
 El Remix
 The Good Doctor (series)
 Chicago Fire (series)
 Mech-Tech Racing

Weekend
 Pet Alien (children)
 Chloe's Closet (children)
 Robotboy (children)
 Sonic X (children)
 Totally Spies! (children)
 WWE SmackDown (Spanish version; wrestling)
 Las Súperestrellas De la Lucha Libre (Wrestling)

Special programs
 Ahí Está la Verdad

Online programs
 60 Segundos
 60 Segundos Salud
 Casate Conmigo
 Backstage Zone
 Ya Somos 4
 D Película
 Bebe Seguro
 Basta Ya
 Dog Guru
 Iguales pero Diferentes
 Ego TV
 Girl Squad
 Menopausia 101
 Hecho Aqui
 Barista Champion
 Estrellas del Deporte
 Las Aventuras del Red
 El Ventetu Deportivo
 Loncheras Saludables
 Deten el Maltrato

Upcoming programming

See also
WAPA-TV
Telemundo
WNJX-TV

References

External links and sources

The Museum of Broadcasting - Puerto Rico TV Profile

Lists of television series by network